Asconiscus is a genus in the Asconiscidae family of marine isopod crustaceans in the suborder Cymothoida,  containing a single genus and a single species, Asconiscus simplex. The original description of the family was made by Bonnier in 1900. A. simplex is a parasite of the shrimp-like crustacean, Boreomysis arctica.

References

Cymothoida
Monotypic crustacean genera
Crustaceans described in 1899